Ivan "Ironman" Stewart (born June 4, 1945) is an American professional off road racing driver.

Racing career

In 1973, Stewart was scheduled to co-drive (navigate) in the Ensenada 300 in a Class 1-2 dune buggy. His driver broke his leg, so Stewart drove the car, and won the race. After some additional conquests, he joined the Toyota factory team in 1983 for Cal Wells at Precision Preparation Inc. He won a total of 82 races. He has won a record 17 races in Mickey Thompson Entertainment Group's (MTEG) stadium series, a record 17 Baja 500's, three Baja 1000's, and SCORE International events. He has won ten point championships, including four SCORE World championships and three MTEG championships. He is the only person so far to win overall including motorcycles while driving a four-wheel vehicle solo in the Baja 1000.

Stewart retired from racing in 2000. He continued to be instrumental in off road racing, becoming a founder in the ProTruck Racing Organization. Since then Toyota introduced the Toyota Tundra pickup truck and soon afterwards produced a very limited number of trucks as the Ivan Stewart Ironman edition. These trucks featured a special Ivan Stewart signature package with Toyota Racing Development (TRD) wheels, grille, interior, and supercharger.

He also became known in the video game circuit, lending his name and his style of stadium racing to a series of games entitled Super Off Road. He wrote a book, Ivan "Ironman" Stewart's Ultimate Off-Road Adventure Guide (Motorbooks, 2007). He also appeared in the Live Action Video for Kids/Real Wheels video, "There Goes a Race Car."

Race wins

1973

1974

1975

1976

1977

1978

1979

1980

1981

1982

1983

1984

1985

1986

1987

1988

1989

1990

1991

1992

1993

1994

1995

1997

1998

1999

Awards
Stewart was a 2006 inductee in the Off-road Motorsports Hall of Fame.

In 2009, Stewart was inducted into the San Diego Hall of Champions Breitbard Hall of Fame.

He was inducted into the Motorsports Hall of Fame of America on March 17, 2020.

References

 Biography at the Offroad Motorsports Hall of Fame

External links
 Toyota/TRD Offroad History
 Protruck.com Bio
 PPI Legacy Site

1945 births
American racing drivers
Living people
Off-road racing
Off-road racing drivers